Bhalswa Horseshoe Lake, or Bhalswa Jheel, is a lake in northwest Delhi, India. It was originally shaped like a horseshoe. However, over the years half of it was used as a landfill area. Now a low income housing colony, an extension of the nearby town of Bhalswa Jahangir Puri, Mukundpur, has been built on it, destroying the once excellent wetland ecosystem and wildlife habitat of the region which once played host to scores of local and migratory wildlife species, especially waterbirds, including waterfowl, storks and cranes. This horseshoe lake was originally formed when the nearby River Yamuna left behind one of its meandering loops here when it changed course over the years and is now channelled through more defined and fortified embankments and dykes to defend modern Delhi from floods. Bhalswa lake but it's half area under Mukundpur colony

Destruction of the lake
On the west side of the lake on the landfill-reclaimed land stands a housing colony. On the east side is a plantation of a few acres of acacia, babool and keekar trees, offering some habitat to local remnant wildlife.

Current status
Though the lake and its surrounding fields were originally an excellent wetland ecosystem which supported a rich wildlife habitat, the Delhi government of late has converted the lake and started promoting it as a water games/sports facility.

Other horseshoe lakes in India
There is another horseshoe-shaped lake, Ansupa Lake near Saranda hills, situated 100 km west of cuttack district in Orissa, having a length of 16 km.

See also
 Bhalswa Jahangir Pur colony / town, Delhi
 Sahibi river
 Najafgarh drain, Delhi
 Najafgarh drain bird sanctuary, Delhi
 Najafgarh lake, Delhi
 National Zoological Park Delhi
 Okhla Sanctuary, bordering Delhi in adjoining Uttar Pradesh
 River Yamuna
 Sultanpur National Park, bordering Delhi in adjoining Gurgaon District, Haryana

References

 How green was my city: eco-tourism on wheels shows impact of pollution, New Delhi, 14 December 2008, Express News Service, Indian Express Newspaper
 Bhalaswa: once there was a lake by Neha Sinha : New Delhi, Tue 11 August 2009.
 Bhalswa Lake cries for maintenance, DNA India, 25 June 2014

External links
Groundwater levels improve in the Capital (Archived from the original on 28 December 2010)
Wateraid.org
Flowers, gardens to cover Delhi's sanitary landfill

Lakes of Delhi
Wetlands of India